The 2008 women's road cycling season was the ninth and last season for the  Vrienden van het Platteland (UCI code: VVP) cycling team, which began as Ondernemers van Nature in 2000.

Ellen van Dijk became European Champion in the time trial and won the stage 2 of the 2008 Tour de l'Aude Cycliste Féminin and the prologue of 2008 Tour Féminin en Limousin. An Van Rie won the Belgian Time Trial Championships. However, the largest victories were on the track. Ellen van Dijk became World Champion in the scratch and European champion in the Women's points race and Women's scratch. At the European championships she also won two silver medals. Willy Kanis won 4 times an individual event at the Track Cycling World Cups in 2008 and together with Yvonne Hijgenaar two times the team sprint event.
The team finished 19th in the 2008 UCI Team Ranking.

Roster

Ages as of 1 January 2008. 

Sources

Guest riders
The team had Felicia Gomez and Linn Torp as guest riders during the Tour of New Zealand and Gomez also during the Geelong Tour.

Season

January–March: track cycling

At the begin of the year Willy Kanis, Yvonne Hijgenaar and Ellen van Dijk were active on the track. At the 3rd round of the 2007–08 UCI Track Cycling World Cup in Los Angeles Kanis and Hijgenaar won the team sprint. At the 4th round in Copenhagen in February Kanis won the sprint and Keirin. Ellen van Dijk and Yvonne Hijgenaar finished in the team pursuit together with Marlijn Binnendijk second in a new Dutch national record.
Ellen van Dijk was chosen to ride the individual pursuit in the remaining two (out of four) 2007–2008 track cycling World Cups due to her good results at the 2007 Dutch National Track Championships. Van Dijk could, via the UCI World Ranking system, potentially earn qualification for the 2008 Olympic Games. She finished in Los Angeles and Copenhagen in fifth and fourth places respectively. After finishing fifth in the individual pursuit at the World Track Championships in Manchester, Van Dijk missed out on qualification for the Olympic games; she finished 12th in the UCI World Rankings and only the first eleven riders qualified. The day after she took revenge by winning her first major senior title, the scratch race at the 2008 World Cycling Championships. With eight laps to go she attacked and rode solo to the finish line. Van Dijk finished at the World Championships in the team pursuit furthermore 6th in a new Dutch national record. At the World Championships Kanis did not win a medal and finished 4th and 5th in the women's 500 m time trial and Women's sprint, Hijgenaar finished in these disciplines 10th and 8th.

April–June: road cycling
At the end of April Annemiek van Vleuten finished second in the GP Stad Roeselare. Martine Bras and Ellen van Dijk were part of the national team at the Tour de l'Aude Cycliste Féminin where they won team time trial stage 2. Furthermore, Ellen van Dijk finished second in the prologue and Bras finished third in stage 7. At the same time the team rode at the Tour de Pologne Feminin where Liesbet De Vocht finished third in the general classification. An Van Rie finished third in the first stage. At the Rabo Ster Zeeuwsche Eilanden in mid June, Ellen van Dijk finished second in the time trial of stage 1. In the later stages Van Dijk and the team fought for her place in the general classification. She won the youth classification and finished third overall.

July–September: road and track cycling championships

As the Dutch national time trial champion and due to her good results in the time trials, Ellen van Dijk was selected to participate at the 2008 European Road Championships. Van Dijk became 2008 European Time Trial Champion and finished 31st in the road race. Ellen van Dijk showed again her strong time trial skills in the Tour Féminin en Limousin where she won the initial time trial stage over 4.6 km. Annemiek van Vleuten finished third, 10 seconds behind her. Van Dijk was not selected to ride the time trial at the Summer Olympics, because the course would be too heavy for her. At the National championships, An Van Rie won the Belgian National Time Trial Championships. Ellen van Dijk could not defend successfully her Dutch national time trial title and finished fourth. Annemiek van Vleuten seventh.

Willy Kanis and Yvonne Hijgenaar participated at the 2008 Summer Olympics on the track in the women's sprint. Kanis lost the bronze-medal match and ended in 4th place. Hijgenaar became 11th. As the scratch world champion Ellen van Dijk also became European Track Champion in the scratch as well as in the points race in September. Van Dijk rode to the silver medal in the elite omnium and the individual pursuit events.

Several riders from the team were selected by their national federation to participate at the 2008 UCI Road World Championships to represent the country. Ellen van Dijk (20th) and An Van Rie participated in the time trial. Nikki Egyed (15th) and Liesbet De Vocht (58th) in the road race

November–December: track cycling
At the end of November Willy Kanis won on the track at the second round of the 2008–09 Track Cycling World Cup in Melbourne the 500m time trial and sprint and together with Yvonne Hijgenaar also the team sprint. At the 2008 Dutch National Track Championships at the end of December Kanis became three times national champion in the sprint disciplines, the 500m time trial, keirin and sprint. Also Ellen van Dijk defended her title successfully in the individual pursuit.

Results

Season victories

Results in major races

Women's World Cup 2008

Other achievements

Dutch national records, team pursuit 

The women's 3000 m team pursuit track cycling discipline was introduced at the 2007–08 track cycling season. The Dutch team including Ellen van Dijk and Yvonne Hijgenaar rode the team pursuit for the first time at Round 4 at the 2007–08 UCI Track Cycling World Cup in Copenhagen in a time of 3:36.901 (49.792 km/h). They broke the record later that day. At the 2008 UCI Track Cycling World Championships the Dutch team including Van Dijk broke the record again in the qualifying round. This is not the current record anymore.

UCI World Ranking

The team finished 19th in the UCI ranking for teams.

References

2008 UCI Women's Teams seasons
2008 in Dutch sport
Vrienden van het Platteland